The Metuje is a river in north-eastern Czech Republic. It is a left tributary of the Labe River. The Metuje flows through several towns, including Teplice nad Metují, Náchod and Nové Město nad Metují. The mouth of the Metuje is located in Jaroměř. One of its tributaries called Klikawa comes from Kudowa-Zdrój in Poland.

References 

Rivers of the Hradec Králové Region